"The Phoenix on the Sword" is one of the original short stories about Conan the Cimmerian written by American author Robert E. Howard and first published in Weird Tales magazine in December 1932. The tale, in which Howard created the character of Conan, was a rewrite of the unpublished Kull story "By This Axe I Rule!", with long passages being identical. The Conan version of the story was republished in the collections King Conan (Gnome Press, 1953) and Conan the Usurper (Lancer Books, 1967). It has most recently been republished in the collections The Conan Chronicles Volume 2: The Hour of the Dragon (Gollancz, 2001) and Conan of Cimmeria: Volume One (1932-1933) (Del Rey, 2003). It is set in the pseudo-historical Hyborian Age and details Conan foiling a plot to unseat him as king of Aquilonia.

Plot summary

A middle-aged Conan of Cimmeria tries to govern the turbulent kingdom of Aquilonia.

Conan has recently seized the crown from King Numedides after strangling the tyrant on his throne. Conan is more suited to swinging his broadsword than signing official documents, though. The Aquilonians who originally welcomed Conan as their liberator have turned against him due to his foreign Cimmerian blood. They have constructed a statue to Numedides' memory in the temple of Mitra, and priests burn incense before their slain king, hailing it as the holy effigy of a saintly monarch who was killed by a red-handed barbarian.

A band known as the Rebel Four forms: Volmana, the dwarfish count of Karaban; Gromel, the giant commander of the Black Legion; Dion, the fat baron of Attalus; and Rinaldo, the hare-brained minstrel. Their goal is to put the crown in the hands of someone with royal blood. The Rebel Four recruit the services of a southern outlaw named Ascalante. However, Ascalante secretly plans to betray his employers and claim the crown.

Ascalante also enslaves Thoth-Amon, a Stygian wizard who has fallen on hard times since losing a mystical ring. A thief had stolen his ring and left Thoth-Amon defenseless, forcing him to flee from Stygia. Disguised as a camel driver, he was waylaid in Koth by Ascalante's reavers. The rest of his caravan was slaughtered, but Thoth-Amon saved himself by revealing his identity and swearing to serve Ascalante.

The conspirators plan to assassinate King Conan when he is unprepared and defenseless. Two unforeseen events thwart their plan. Conan is warned of a coup by the arrival of a long-dead sage named Epemitreus, who marks Conan's sword with a mystical phoenix representing Mitra, a Hyborian god. Also, Thoth-Amon murders Dion and recovers his lost ring of power. He then summons a fanged ape-like demon to slay Ascalante. Conan slays the three remaining members of the Rebel Four, breaking his sword upon the helm of Gromel and using a battle-axe against the rest of his would-be assassins. Conan hesitates to kill Rinaldo, whose songs once touched the King's heart. This scruple costs Conan, as Rinaldo manages to stab him before being killed.

Ascalante, his goal in reach, moves to finish off the wounded king. But before Ascalante can strike, he is killed by Thoth-Amon's demon, which is then slain by Conan with the shard of his enchanted sword.

Adaptation
Writer Roy Thomas and artists Vicente Alcázar & Yong Montano adapted the story in Conan the Barbarian Annual #2 (1976).

See also
 Robert E. Howard bibliography

References

External links

 The Phoenix on the Sword at Project Gutenberg Australia
 Conan the Barbarian at AmratheLion.com
 Conan.com: The Official Website

1932 short stories
Conan the Barbarian stories by Robert E. Howard
Pulp stories
Horror short stories
Fantasy short stories
Works originally published in Weird Tales